Falling Moon or variation, may refer to:

 Moonset, the setting (falling) of the moon, analogue of sunset
 "Falling Moon" (song), a 2011 song by Ulala Session off the album Superstar K 3
 "The Falling Moon" (story), a 1966 comics storyline from the comic book The Trigan Empire
 "Falling Moon" (story), a 1962 comics storyline from Flash Gordon; see List of Flash Gordon comic strips
 , a fictional element from Shuriken Sentai Ninninger; see List of Shuriken Sentai Ninninger characters

See also

 Moonfall (disambiguation)
 Fallen Moon (disambiguation)
 Falling (disambiguation)
 Moon (disambiguation)